Shadow Hunter is a three issue comic book limited series by Virgin Comics and porn star, entertainer and author Jenna Jameson. It is part of Virgin Comics' Voices line, which allows celebrities to create their own comic books. The story was conceptualized by Jenna Jameson and Witchblade writer Christina Z, who wrote the script. Mukesh Singh illustrated the book.

Story
A young, orphaned, beautiful woman, Jezzerie Jaden, attempts to make a life for herself in the big city. As she grapples with mundane problems like making rent and a creepy manager at work, something deeper brews: a nagging suspicion that her life is not her own. Seeking answers (not to mention extra cash) she enrolls in a past life regression experiment which seems to ignite visions of a demonic past that no one can explain.

Publications
Issue #0 was released on January 2, 2008
Issue #1 was released on February 20, 2008 
Issue #2 was released on April 9, 2008
Issue #3 was released on May 28, 2008

References
 Shadow Hunter Main Page at Virgin Comics 

2007 comics debuts
Virgin Comics titles
Jenna Jameson